Seal Cove is a community on Grand Manan Island, New Brunswick. Formerly a separate village, it was amalgamated into the newly formed village of Grand Manan in 1995.

History

Notable people

See also
List of communities in New Brunswick

References

Neighbourhoods in New Brunswick
Communities in Charlotte County, New Brunswick
Populated places disestablished in 1995
Former villages in New Brunswick